Anton Alekseyevich Belov (born 2 May 1996) is a Russian football player who plays for Metallurg Lipetsk.

Club career
Belov made his debut in the Russian Professional Football League for FC Zenit Penza on 16 April 2017 in a game against FC Energomash Belgorod.

Belov made his debut for the main squad of FC Anzhi Makhachkala on 20 September 2017 in a Russian Cup game against FC Luch-Energiya Vladivostok.

Belov made his Russian Premier League debut for Anzhi on 15 March 2019 in a game against FC Krylia Sovetov Samara.

On 17 June 2019, Anzhi announced that Belov had left the club to sign for Armenian Premier League club FC Pyunik. On 2 July 2020, Pyunik announced that Belov had left the club after his contract had expired.

On 7 July 2020, Belov signed for Tom Tomsk on a one-year contract.

References

External links
 Profile by Russian Professional Football League

1996 births
Sportspeople from Saratov
Living people
Russian footballers
Russian expatriate footballers
Association football defenders
FC Anzhi Makhachkala players
FC Pyunik players
FC Tom Tomsk players
Russian Premier League players
Armenian Premier League players
Russian expatriate sportspeople in Armenia
Expatriate footballers in Armenia
FC Metallurg Lipetsk players